Since June 4, 2001, the Canadian province of Nova Scotia has offered Domestic partnership registration to unmarried couples, both same-sex and different-sex, thereby entitling them to some, but not all, of the rights and benefits of marriage.

Legislation
In the previous year, the General Assembly passed the Law Reform (2000) Act, the full title of which is "An Act to Comply with Certain Court Decisions and to Modernize and Reform Laws in the Province."  The act was passed in the wake of the landmark decision of the Supreme Court of Canada in the case of M. v. H. on May 19, 1999.

In the first six months after the law came into effect, only 94 domestic partnerships were registered, in contrast to about 5500 marriages per year in the province. Of the 94 partnerships, 83 (88%) were same-sex couples.

Rights and Benefits
At the time the 2000 act was passed, domestic partners who registered with the provincial authorities were entitled to the same rights and obligations as spouses under the following laws:

the Fatal Injuries Act
the Health Act
the Hospitals Act
the Insurance Act
the Intestate Succession Act
the Maintenance and Custody Act
the Matrimonial Property Act
the Members' Retiring Allowances Act
the Pension Benefits Act
the Probate Act
the Provincial Court Act
or as a widow or widower under the Testators' Family Maintenance Act

Registration
Unmarried adults over age 19 in a conjugal relationship, not party to another domestic partnership, who live in Nova Scotia or own property there may file a declaration of domestic partnership with the Nova Scotia Vital Statistics Agency.  By registering, the couple immediately gains the family court legal recognition, rights and benefits available to common law spouses under provincial law.

Termination
Domestic partnerships in Nova Scotia may be terminated in one of the following ways:
both parties jointly file a Statement of Termination with Vital Statistics
one party files an affidavit with Vital Statistics that the couple have lived separate and apart for more than a year
the parties enter into a separation agreement pursuant to the Maintenance and Custody Act and file proof of such an agreement with Vital Statistics
one of the parties files with Vital Statistics proof of marriage to a third party, which automatically ends the domestic partnership

See also
 Same-sex marriage in Nova Scotia  
 Same-sex marriage in Canada

References

External links
Domestic Partnerships, Vital Statistics Agency, Nova Scotia
Third Reading version of the Law Reform (2000) Act, General Assembly of Nova Scotia 
Final Report of the Review Panel on Common-Law Relationships to the Attorney General of Manitoba, 2001
Marriage and Legal Recognition of Same-sex Unions, A Discussion Paper, Department of Justice, Canada, November 2002
Sexual Orientation and Legal Rights, a review paper by the Library of Parliament, Ottawa, revised 28 July 2005

Marriage, unions and partnerships in Canada
Nova Scotia provincial legislation
Family law in Canada